Carpaidion is a genus of mites in the family Parasitidae.

Species
 Carpaidion cingulatum Athias-Henriot, 1979     
 Carpaidion cinqulatum C. Athias-Henriot, 1979

References

Parasitidae